Sirinhaém is a municipality in Pernambuco with 46,361 inhabitants. The town was founded in 1614 making it among the oldest in the state. The Mayor is Camila Machado Leocadio Lins Dos Santos (PP, 2021 – 2024).

Access

BR-101, PE-060, PE-064 (via Cabo de Santo Agostinho)

Geography

 State - Pernambuco
 Region - RMR (Recife)
 Boundaries - Ipojuca and Escada  (N);  Rio Formoso and Tamandaré  (S);  Ribeirão  (W); Atlantic Ocean   (E)
 Area - 378.8 km2
 Elevation - 49 m
 Vegetation - Forest Subperenifólia and Coconut trees
 Climate - Hot tropical and humid
 Mean and high annual temperatures - 20.1 °C; 29.5 °C
 Distance to Recife - 65 km

Beaches

Gamela beach

Beach of clear water, reefs and extensive areas of coconut trees. It has some bars and Palhoças (tents) offering typical food of the region (based in fish and seafood).

Guadalupe beach
 
Still almost virgin in its 3 kilometers long. Its part of the Gold Coast Project, created to develop in a planned and environmentally way the potential of one extensive coast area since Cabo de Santo Agostinho until Maragogi in Alagoas.

Barra de Sirinhaém beach

Fluvial - marine beach, is largely used to practice water sports. With six kilometers long, has several sections where bathing is not recommended, due to the violence of the waves.

Ilha de Santo Aleixo - Sirinhaém

Economy

The main economic activities in Sirinhaém are based in food and beverage industry, commerce, some tourism and agriculture especially coconuts.

Economic indicators

Economy by Sector, 2008

Health indicators

Distances from Sirinhaém

References

Populated coastal places in Pernambuco
Populated places established in 1614
Municipalities in Pernambuco
1614 establishments in the Portuguese Empire